Juan Bascuñán (20 July 1892 – June 1969) was a Chilean long-distance runner. He competed in the marathon at the 1920 Summer Olympics where he finished in 33rd place.

References

External links
 

1892 births
1969 deaths
Athletes (track and field) at the 1920 Summer Olympics
Chilean male long-distance runners
Chilean male marathon runners
Chilean emigrants to the United States
Olympic athletes of Chile
Sportspeople from Valparaíso
People from Yaphank, New York